The second season of the Italian singing competition The Voice Senior  will start to air on November 26, 2021, on Rai 1. All coaches from the previous season returned except for I Caricci (Al Bano and Jasmine Carrisi). Orietta Berti was announced to be the new coach of the show, joining Loredana Bertè, Clementino and Gigi D'Alessio.

Antonella Clerici is the host of the program.

Annibale Giannarelli was announced as winner, marking Gigi D'Alessio's first win as a coach. Gigi was also the first ever coach in The Voice of Italy to win more than one season.

Coaches 
On July 16, 2021, Rai 1 announces that The Voice Senior will be back on screen for its second season. In the same date, announced that Orietta Beri will be the new coach for the upcoming season, replacing the duo coach I Carrisi (Al Bano and Jasmine Carrisi).

Teams 

  Winner
  Runner-up
  Third place
  Fourth place
  Eliminated in the Final
  Eliminated in the Knockouts
  Eliminated in the Best of six
  Withdrew

Blind auditions 
Blind auditions premiered on November 26, Each coach must have fifteen artists on their team at the end of the blind auditions. With each coach given one "block" to use in the entire blind auditions. At the end of the blind auditions, Orietta didn't use block.

Knockouts
In this round, where also labelled as the "semi-finals",  each coach groups his/her artists into two groups of three. Each coach can advance one or two artists to the final phase. At the end of each round, three artists per team will advance to the finals.

Final 

The final was broadcast on 21 January 2022. In the first phase of the final, the twelve talents who reached the final must perform a cover assigned by their coach. At the end of the first phase, only four, from any team, will advance on the second phase of the final. At the end of the second and final phase, the winner of the second edition of The Voice Senior will be announced.

Cosetta Gigli of Team Orietta will not be present due to injury. She was replaced by Daniele Montero.

Riccardo Cocciante performed this song

Round 1

Round 2

References 

Italian television series
Italian television shows
Italy